Tezpur Assembly constituency is one of the 126 assembly constituencies of  Assam a north east state of India.  Tezpur is also part of Tezpur Lok Sabha constituency.

Members of Legislative Assembly

 1957: Kamala Prasad Agarwalla, Indian National Congress
 1962: Kamala Prasad Agarwalla, Indian National Congress
 1967: B. P. Rabbha, Independent
 1970: B. C. Bhagawati, NCJ
 1973: Robindra Kumar Goswami, Indian National Congress
 1978: Jiban Bora, Janata Party
 1983: Nabin Chandra Kath Hazarika, Indian National Congress
 1985: Brindaban Goswami, Independent
 1991: Bijit Saikia, Indian National Congress
 1996: Brindaban Goswami, Asom Gana Parishad
 2001: Brindaban Goswami, Asom Gana Parishad
 2006: Brindaban Goswami, Asom Gana Parishad
 2011: Rajen Borthakur, Indian National Congress
 2016: Brindaban Goswami, Asom Gana Parishad
 2021: Prithiraj Rava, Asom Gana Parishad

Election results

2016 results

See also
 Tezpur
 List of constituencies of Assam Legislative Assembly

References

External links 
 

Assembly constituencies of Assam
Tezpur
Sonitpur district